Anjalika is a 2006 Sinhala romance film. It was written by Mahesh Rathsara and directed by Channa Perera. The film features Channa Perera, Pooja Umashankar and Anarkali Akarsha in the leading roles while Rex Kodippili, and Sanath Gunathilake play key supporting roles. It was produced by Malith Palliyaguruge, the film had music scored by Rohana Weerasinghe. The film marked the debut acting by Kollywood actress Pooja in Sinhala cinema. Popular television presenter, Narada Bakmeewewa also made his cinema debut with the film.

It was released in June 2006 to good reviews and good box office, even though the plot was criticized by critics. This was Pooja's first Sinhala film.

The film has been shot in Malaysia, becoming the first Sri Lankan to be filmed in that country.

Synopsis 
A young man named Thivanka returns home to Sri Lanka from England to fall in love with a village girl named Anjalika. This proves to be problematic for Thivanka, as Anjalika is the daughter of a plantation caretaker employed by Thivanka's father. Thivanka's childhood friend, Kavya is in love with Thivanka and wants to marry him. The inevitable clash of rich and poor ends in the kidnapping and subsequent death of Anjalika. Thivanka, reeling from grief, decides to accompany a friend to Malaysia to clear his mind.

While there, he meets a girl named Uttara who is a look alike of Anjalika. He eventually learns that the girl is Anjalika, and her death was faked by his father, Clifford, who mistakenly thought he was Anjalika's biological father, and that he therefore needed to stop the marriage between Thivanka and Anjalika. Later, it is revealed that Anjalika is not Clifford's child. Finally, Thivanka and Anjalika marry while Kavya marries Thivanka's friend Gagana.

Cast 
Channa Perera as Thivanka Imbulgoda
Pooja Umashankar as Anjalika/Uttara (Voice by Nadeesha Hemamali)
Anarkali Akarsha as Kavya
Rex Kodippili as Eardley Samaradivakara, Kavya's father
Narada Bakmeewewa as Gagana, Thivanka's friend
Maureen Charuni as Anjalika's mother
Lakshman Mendis as Piyadasa, Anjalika's father
Sanath Gunathilake as Clifford Imbulgoda
Rosy Senanayake as Paba Kumarihamy Imbulgoda
Robin Fernando as Police Officer
Oshadhi Hewamadduma as Meena
G.R Perera

Release 
The film opened to good reviews. Chamitha Kuruppu of the Sunday Observer online edition was very complimentary towards Pooja: "All the credit goes to pretty Pooja Umashankar from India who portrays the title character Anjalika. The film will no doubt be a commercial hit, thanks to Pooja's brilliant acting, superb dancing skills and of course her gorgeous looks. Young Pooja's performance as mischievous Anjalika living a carefree life hanging around with children in a village, deserves all the praise. Applause to you Channa for your sweet and worthy 'introduction' to the Sinhala cinema!"
 
"Anjalika will definitely be a commercial hit, thanks to lovely Pooja, breathtaking sceneries(sic) and Rohana Weerasinghe's brilliant music. There is no doubt that Sri Lankan film lovers will welcome Pooja with warm hearts and adore her performance. In simple words, Pooja has stolen the limelight.

References 

2006 films
2000s Sinhala-language films
Films set in Sri Lanka (1948–present)